Serendipity is an accidental lucky discovery.

Serendipity may also refer to:

Entertainment
 Serendipity (film), 2001 film starring Kate Beckinsale and John Cusack
 Serendipity (book series), written by Stephen Cosgrove
 Serendipity the Pink Dragon, an anime television series based on the book series
 Serendipity (U.K. TV series), British arts and crafts television series in 1973
 Serendipity (U.S. TV series), local KNBC children's series broadcast in the 1970s
 "Serendipity", an episode of the TV series Law & Order: Special Victims Unit
 Serendipity, a character played by Salma Hayek in the film Dogma

Music
 Serendipity singers, a 1960s American folk group
 Serendipity (Mike Garson album), 1986
 Serendipity (Walt Dickerson album), 1977
 Serendipity, an album by Premiata Forneria Marconi
 "Serendipity", a song on the album Barenaked Ladies Are Men by Barenaked Ladies
 "Serendipity", a song on the album Amaranthe by Amaranthe
 "Serendipity", a song by Angelina Pivarnick featuring Adam Barta
 "Serendipity", a song on the album Once Only Imagined by The Agonist
 "Serendipity" (BTS song)
"Serendipity" (Mai Kuraki song)

Other uses
 Serendipity 3, a restaurant and boutique started in New York City
 Serendipity Beach, a famous beach in Sihanoukville, South Cambodia
 Serendipity (software), a PHP based blog and web-based content management system.

See also